Weepah Way for Now is a 2015 American comedy-drama film written and directed by Stephen Ringer and starring Aly Michalka and AJ Michalka.

Premise
Elle and Joy are two sisters apart by two years. The two are singers and are living together away from the city and making do with the new life they have chosen.

Cast
Aly Michalka as Elle, the elder sister
AJ Michalka as Joy, the younger sister
Mimi Rogers as Lynn, Elle and Joy’s mother
Amanda Crew as Alice, Elle and Joy’s friend
Saoirse Ronan as Emily (voice), Elle and Joy’s deceased sister
Liam Aiken as Reed, Elle’s love interest
Gil Bellows as John, Elle and Joy’s father
Dan Byrd as Dan, Elle and Joy’s closest friend
Madeline Zima as Lauren, a friend of Elle and Joy
Erin Cummings as Susan, John’s girlfriend
Ryan Donowho as Syd, Joy’s love interest
Gale Harold as Theatrical Agent
Jon Heder as Ernie
Tyler Labine as Record Executive

Release
The film made its worldwide premiere on June 16, 2015 at the Los Angeles Film Festival.

References

External links
 
 

2015 comedy-drama films
2015 independent films
2010s coming-of-age comedy-drama films
American coming-of-age comedy-drama films
American independent films
Films about singers
Films about sisters
Films scored by Mike Einziger
2010s English-language films
2010s American films